Furkan Andıç (born 4 April 1990) is a Turkish actor and model, known for Kaçak Gelinler (2014–2015), Bir Kurabiye Masalı (2012), Kolej Günlüğü (2011), Tatlı İntikam (2016), Meryem (2017) and Her Yerde Sen (2019)

Life
Andıç was born and raised in Istanbul, Turkey. His mother is of Bosnian descent while his father is from Trabzon, Turkey. He graduated from Yeditepe University in 2012. He's the middle son of his parents' three sons.

He began his television career with the TNT series Kolej Günlüğü (College Diary). In August 2015, it was announced that he had been cast in the Turkish TV series Kırgın Çiçekler.  

He then played in Kaçak Gelinler. In 2016, he portrayed the character Sinan/Tankut on Kanal D's series Tatlı İntikam. In 2017, he was cast in a leading role in the TV series Meryem. In January 2018, he revealed that he was in a relationship with actress Dilan Çiçek Deniz. The two broke up in November 2018. In June 2019, he was cast in a leading role in the TV series Her Yerde Sen alongside Aybüke Pusat.

Filmography

References

External links

1990 births
21st-century Turkish male actors
Male actors from Istanbul
Living people
Turkish Muslims
Turkish male television actors
Turkish people of Bosniak descent
Turkish male film actors